Mathilde Margarethe Lange (April 14, 1888 - June 1972) was an American biologist known for her research in experimental embryology. She was born in New York City and her father was a physician and surgeon. She attended the University of Zurich and earned her Ph.D. in 1920. She was employed by the United States Department of Agriculture for the first year following her Ph.D. as a researcher. Lange then moved to Wheaton College, Massachusetts as a professor of zoology, where she remained until her retirement in 1950. Her professional memberships included the New York Academy of Growth and the Genetic Association.

References 

American embryologists
American women biologists
Women zoologists
Wheaton College (Massachusetts) faculty
University of Zurich alumni
1888 births
1972 deaths
20th-century American zoologists
American expatriates in Switzerland
20th-century American women scientists